"Rei II", also known by the Japanese title  is the sixth episode of the anime Neon Genesis Evangelion, which was created by Gainax. "Rei II" was written by Hideaki Anno and Akio Satsukawa and directed by Hiroyuki Ishido. The series is set fifteen years after a worldwide cataclysm named Second Impact, and is mostly set in the futuristic, fortified fictional city of Tokyo-3. The episode's protagonist is teenage boy Shinji Ikari, who is recruited by his father Gendo to the organization Nerv to pilot a bio-machine mecha named Evangelion against beings called Angels. In the episode, Shinji must annihilate the fifth Angel Ramiel, who is able to destroy every enemy in its vicinity with an accelerated particles cannon. A plan called Operation Yashima is worked out, which involves Shinji shooting Ramiel from a distance with a Positron Rifle.

Production of the sixth episode took place simultaneously with the fifth, "Rei I", before the third, "A Transfer" and the fourth, "Hedgehog's Dilemma". The final scene, in which female pilot Rei Ayanami smiles at Shinji, has been described by staff and critics as the end of Evangelion's grand narrative. "Rei II" first aired on TV Tokyo on November 8, 1995, and scored a 7.7% rating audience share on Japanese TV. The episode was positively received by critics, who praised the interpretation of the Japanese voice actors, the deepening of the relationship between Shinji and Rei, and the realism of Operation Yashima. The Operation entered Japanese popular culture, being referenced on other shows. Merchandise based on the episode was also released.

Plot

Shinji Ikari, the pilot of the giant mecha Evangelion, is attacked and damaged by Ramiel, the fifth of a series of enemies known as Angels. His Evangelion Unit-01 is recovered and Shinji is rescued and hospitalized. The Angel then settles over the headquarters of the special agency Nerv and began to drill the land to reach it, destroying every enemy that approaches with a particle cannon. While Shinji is recovering, Nerv's Major, Misato Katsuragi, comes up with a plan named Operation Yashima: to destroy Ramiel with a positron beam rifle, fired from outside Ramiel's attack zone. For the plan, the rifle must be able to withstand a high amount of electric energy, and is determined that it needs power from the whole Japan.

While the countdown for the shooting is starting, Ramiel starts to charge to attack the Evangelion and shoots toward it, simultaneously with the Evangelion's rifle's shot, resulting in the collision of the two beams and the shots miss. Ramiel charges up for a second attack, which it can fire at Shinji before he can prepare his positron rifle for a second shot. Rei Ayanami in Evangelion Unit-00 steps in and shields Unit-01 from Ramiel's beam, but both the shield and Unit-00 sustain severe damage in the process. Shinji fires his second shot, which pierces the Angel and kills it, stopping the drill. Shinji force ejects Unit-00's cockpit and opens the hatch. Rei is unharmed and unfazed. Shinji cries and Rei says she doesn't know what to feel; Shinji advises her to smile, and Rei smiles.

Production

In 1993 Gainax produced a presentation document of Neon Genesis Evangelion named . In "Proposal", the basic plot for the sixth episode was already planned and the Japanese title "Showdown in Tokyo-3" was decided. "The Eva's revenge" was also planned to take place in the installment. Neon Genesis Evangelion director Hideaki Anno and Akio Satsukawa wrote "Rei II", while Masayuki drew the storyboards. Hiroyuki Ishido served as director, Nobuhiro Hosoi as chief animator, and Rei Yumeno as assistant character designer.

Anno felt stuck after writing the script for the first episode, "Angel Attack", which took half a year to complete, so he wrote "Rei I" and "Rei II" before the third and the fourth episodes. For production reasons, the post-recording dubbing followed the same order. He encountered difficulties while writing for Rei, not feeling "particularly interested" or relating to her, but he thought of her as a representation of his unconscious mind and shaped the character with the phrase "You won't die, I will protect you". At the end of the episode he also inserted a scene where Rei smiles at Shinji, but he later regretted it, since Shinji and Rei manage to communicate with each other and establish emotional contact in the episode; according to Anno, the character of Rei thus reaches its conclusion smiling.

The episode was the first time two Evangelion units were portrayed at the same time, so they were intentionally represented with few movements, with the Eva-00 using only a shield and the Eva-01 motionless while shooting Ramiel, to save animation resources. Ramiel's design was also conceived to save money. While Sachiel, the Angel from the first and second episodes, has a humanoid shape, Ramiel has a geometric abstract shape, because the staff did not have enough resources for an anthropomorphic enemy. Moreover, according to series assistant director Kazuya Tsurumaki, "everything after the storyboard was ordered by another company", and Gainax had no control over it.

In "Rei II", captions were used to create a documentary feel, a technique Anno previously used in Gunbuster. The installment also depicts real existing places during the preparations for Operation Yashima, such as Mount Futago, Ube and Minato, the birthplace of Anno and the headquarters of Gainax, respectively. A map of Japan is framed during the operation, drawn with differences from actuality. Since Second Impact raised the sea level in the Evangelion universe, the smaller islands are difficult to trace on the map, while the main islands of Honshu, Hokkaido, Shikoku, and Kyushu have different shapes. Megumi Hayashibara, Rei's voice actress, performed the voice of an anonymous woman making time announcements during the process; Tetsuya Iwanaga and Tomokazu Seki voiced as Nerv operators, while Yuko Miyamura voiced a female announcer. A version of Fly Me to the Moon sung by Hayashibara was also used for the ending theme of the episode.

Cultural references 

According to Yūichirō Oguro, an editor of some Japanese home video editions of Evangelion, the Japanese title "Showdown in Tokyo-3" is a possible reference to the sixth episode of Return of Ultraman, "Showdown! Monsters vs. MAT". Like "Rei II", "Showdown! Monsters vs. MAT" contains a large-scale operation. Oguro noted that ticker tape is also used during the episode, similarly to Anno's previous works Gunbuster and Nadia: The Secret of Blue Water. He compared the use of ticker tape to the works by director Kihachi Okamoto. Critics also speculated that Ramiel's design was influenced by Mirai Keisatsu Urashiman and 2001: A Space Odyssey (1968).

The name of Operation Yashima originates from the Battle of Yashima, fought in 1185, during the Genpei War. According to a legend, the samurai warrior Nasu no Yoichi riding his horse shot an arrow through the water and hit the red fan of his enemy Tamamushi, resolving the battle in favor of the Minamoto clan. In Neon Genesis Evangelion Ramiel is similarly centered and beaten by a precise shot fired from a position located across the waters of Lake Ashi, Mount Futago. A different spelling of the term  can be translated as "eight countries", an ancient epithet of Japan, a reference to the Positron Rifle's electrical energy, taken from the entire Japanese archipelago. The naming is the result of a specific request from the series' director, Hideaki Anno, who asked to include something related to the name Yashima during the production.

In "Rei II" scientific concepts are used as well. During Operation Yashima, for example, Eva-01 uses the Positron Sniper Rifle, which draws its power from positron acceleration, generating a bright beam of photons. The Magi System, a biological supercomputer composed of three computers that rule Nerv and Tokyo-3, is also mentioned for the first time in the episode. The Magi System is a democratic and rational system similar to the concept of artificial intelligence. Its name originates from the Biblical Magi who came from the East mentioned in the Gospel of Matthew, traditionally named Melchior, Balthazar, and Gaspar. According to the official Evangelion film books, like the three astrologers from whom it takes its name, the supercomputer is composed of three independent calculators that to solve any kind of problem consult each other and make a decision by majority.

Themes 

"Rei II" depicts the inner world of Rei Ayanami, focus of the episode. Neon Genesis Evangelion assistant director Kazuya Tsurumaki pointed out how "distant, awkward communication" can be initially observed between Shinji and Rei in the first episodes, describing Evangelion as a story about communication. In "Rei I" and "Rei II" Ayanami is initially cold towards Shinji, who tries to communicate with her but is rejected. At the end of the episode, Shinji saves her in a similar way to how his father Gendo did in the previous episode. Shinji bursts into tears, and Rei says she doesn't know what to do at times like that; Shinji advises her to smile. Rei overlays Shinji's and Gendo's faces and smiles, and it is not clear if she is able to understand Shinji's feelings in the scene. Writer Dani Cavallaro described it as "an ambiguous Mona Lisa smile". For critic Manabu Tsuribe, the show reaches its climax at the smile scene, and "as a story of 'growth and independence of a boy'—like a Bildungsroman—ended there once. Evangelion as a story has stopped there". Assistant director Masayuki gave a similar interpretation.

Evangelion Chronicle magazine noted how the tactical realism of Operation Yashima was a rarity for anime at the time. The magazine linked the realism of the strategy to the Gulf War, the images of which had a high resonance in the Japanese and world media; following the conflict from the 1990s onwards, there was an increased focus on the war realism of the fighting in TV shows.

Writer Dennis Redmond noted that Rei is silhouetted against a close-up of the full Moon before Yashima Operation. Writer Yumiko Yano noted that the Moon is a celestial body associated with passivity and femininity and observed an unattainable aura in Rei, comparing her to the Virgin Mary. Yano also associated her figure with the fragile and chaste women portrayed in fin de siècle art, particularly popular among the works of Symbolists painters. For Redmond, "Rei II" illustrates the Japanese national power grid via a satellite shot of Japan from outer space; he also compared the social and natural landscapes of Evangelion to that of postwar Japan. For reviewer Akio Nagatomi, Rei's attitude in the episode also reflects one of the traits of traditional Japanese society, the martyr complex, in which a person will do whatever it takes to accomplish a given task, regardless of personal consequences.

Reception 
"Rei II" was first broadcast on November 8, 1995, and scored a 7.7% rating of audience share on Japanese TV, the highest up to that point. According to Junichi Sato, after the episode's broadcast Evangelion and Rei Ayanami enjoyed high sales in the Japanese market of fan-made comics, known as doujinshi. In 1996, the episode ranked fourth among Animage list of "Best Anime Episodes". In February 1996, Animedia magazine ranked Rei's smile scene among the most memorable anime moments of the month. TV Asahi later published a ranking of the most significant scenes in the history of animation; the scene where "Rei Ayanami smiles at Shinji for the first time" managed to reach 14th position. Rei's smile also appeared in another ranking of the broadcaster, winning 45th place.

"Rei II" received a positive reception from critics and reviewers. Anime magazine Newtype praised "Rei II", describing the scene where Rei greets Shinji before the battle against the Angel Ramiel as "impressive". The Artifice's Justin Wu also praised the scene of Rei's smile, describing it as a "powerful" and "iconic moment", since it is "the first time she has deliberately shown an emotion, and one of the handful of times she has done so throughout the whole series". Merumo described it as a "touching" moment. According to writer Dennis Redmond, Rei's smile is one of many "extraordinary moments" in the series where battles "artfully embellish, rather than overwhelm, the subtlest of character interaction".

Critic Dani Cavallaro praised Anno's tendency to foreground "delicate character interactions": "The action element, therefore, unquestionably enriches yet never threatens to asphyxiate the affective import of events". Ramiel was particularly well received by fans, being considered one of Evangelion's best enemies, while Operation Yashima became one of the most popular fights in the series. In July 2020, Comic Book Resources reported an 8.3/10 rating on IMDb for the installment, ranking it ninth among the highest-rated Evangelion episodes.

Comic Book Resources' Devin Meenan praised Rei's smile scene as "one of the most touching moments" of Neon Genesis Evangelion. Film School Rejects's Max Covill similarly described "Rei II" as "one of the more exciting episodes in the series' run", praising a shot depicting the dark silhouettes of Misato, Shinji, and Rei for the usage of negative space and hard lines. The Animé Café's Akio Nagatomi praised the parallels between "Rei I" and "Rei II" as "interesting", the acting of voice actresses Megumi Ogata as Shinji Ikari and Mitsuishi Kotono as Misato Katsuragi) and Rei's reaction towards Shinji: "Even though the outcome is entirely predictable, it's fairly well written". Comic Book Resources and Screen Rant listed the battle against Ramiel among the best Neon Genesis Evangelion fights.

SyFy Wire's Daniel Dockery listed Operation Yashima as one of the "most awesome non-depressing" moments in the show. Animator Yūichirō Oguro eulogized the sense of sci-fi romance as Japan's lights go out and the archipelago goes completely dark, while 25 Years Later's John Bernardy praised the scene in which all the lights of Japan go out to power the Eva-01 rifle and its "simple melancholy in the piano arpeggio". Dennis Redmond similarly lauded the shots of the sequence of Tokyo-3 going dark as "magnificent" and the "brilliant sequence of frames" shown during Shinji and Rei's conversation, while Multiversity Comics' Matthew Garcia positively commented on the use of traditional animation for the Operation Yashima. For Kotaku'''s editor Peter Tieryas the episode "epitomized what makes the series so mesmerising"; he also praised the tactical element to the battle and its realism.

Legacy
The episode inspired a line of official T-shirts. In 1996, an Evangelion-inspired role-playing game entitled  was released. Operation Yashima was later used for the movie Evangelion: 1.0 You Are (Not) Alone (2007) and a pachinko named , released in Japan in April 2009. It also inspired official merchandise, including model railways, clothing, keychains, action figures, tenugui, notebooks, sculptures, food and watches.

After the 2011 Tōhoku earthquake and tsunami, Tokyo Electric Power Company invited Japanese people to conserve electricity, and an unofficial campaign begun under the name "Operation Yashima" (Yashima Sakusen) on Twitter. The Twitter hashtag #yashimasakusen110312 went viral, while #84MA (pronounced Yashima) reached about 50,000 tweets in two days. According to The Anime Encyclopedia, while the real Yashima Operation Evangelion became part of the mass media; its writers Jonathan Clements and Helen McCarthy noted that the franchise was probably at the high point of its 21st-century popularity at the time, having reached a wide audience in Japan. In 2019, the Yashima Operation also inspired a "Nerv" disaster app after Typhoon Faxai hit the Kantō region. In 2020, an event dedicated to Yashima Operation was announced in the city of Hakone, the area where the fictional city of Tokyo-3 is imaginatively located; new merchandise articles on the series were also announced. During the event, organized on two dates (March 28 and May 23), a live performance of "Cruel Angel's Thesis"'s singer Yoko Takahashi was planned, but the dates were postponed due to the COVID-19 pandemic. In 2021, the Governor of Tokyo Yuriko Koike asked the city to turn off lights after 8 pm to discourage going out at night and fight Coronavirus. The media associated her request with Operation Yashima, ushering in another Twitter trend.

The website Final Fantasy Dream compared Sister Ray, a weapon that appeared in Final Fantasy VII, to the Positron Rifle used by Shinji during the Yashima Operation. In Eureka Seven, male protagonist Renton Thurston wants to make female co-protagonist Eureka smile; writer Dani Cavallaro regarded his desire as reminiscent of Rei's smile in "Rei II". British band Fightstar published a song named "Shinji Ikari", which contains the line "I grow old after one shot", which Japanese website Anibu described as a possible reference to "Rei II". The Nippon Professional Baseball team Hanshin Tigers used the OST "Decisive Battle" during the matches after Operation Yashima, a choice that attracted attention in the Japanese media. The same OST was used in the third episode of the Japanese TV series Rikokatsu. Rei's line "You won't die, because I'll protect you" is also parodied in a Nisemonogatari'' episode.

References
  Text was copied/adapted from Episode 06 at Evangelion wiki, which is released under a Creative Commons Attribution-Share Alike 3.0 (Unported) (CC-BY-SA 3.0) license.

Citations

Bibliography

External links
 

1995 Japanese television episodes
Neon Genesis Evangelion episodes
Science fiction television episodes